Det Nordenfjeldske Teglverk was a brick manufacturer in Skånland, Norway.

It was started in 1942 at Sandstrand in Skånland. Local entrepreneurs were backed by capital from Oslo. The factory had a capacity of 3.5-4 million bricks. It went bankrupt in 1970; after a hiatus the factory was restarted and operated for three more years. It finally went defunct in 1975.

References

Manufacturing companies of Norway
Companies based in Troms
Defunct companies of Norway
Manufacturing companies established in 1942
Manufacturing companies disestablished in 1975
1942 establishments in Norway
1975 disestablishments in Norway